Daulatpur is an upazila of Kushtia District in the Division of Khulna, Bangladesh.

Geography
It has 66479 households and total area 468.76 km2.

Daulatpur Upazila is bounded by Bagha Upazila in Rajshahi District and Lalpur Upazila in Natore District, on the north, Bheramara and Mirpur Upazilas on the east, Gangni Upazila in Meherpur District and Mirpur Upazila in Kushtia District, on the south, and Jalangi CD Block, in Murshidabad district, West Bengal, India, and Karimpur I and Karimpur II CD Blocks, Nadia district, West Bengal, on the west.

Demographics
According to 2011 Bangladesh census, Daulatpur had a population of 456,372. Males constituted 49.90% of the population and females 50.10. Muslims formed 99.375% of the population, Hindus 0.614%, Christians 0.009% and others 0.002%. Daulatpur had a literacy rate of 41.29% for the population 7 years and above.

As of the 1991 Bangladesh census, Daulatpur has a population of 360,706. Males constitute 51.42% of the population, and females 48.58%. This Upazila's eighteen up population is 178,539. Daulatpur has an average literacy rate of 20.5% (7+ years), and the national average of 32.4% literate.

Administration
Daulatpur Upazila is divided into 14 union parishads: Adabaria, Ariaa, Boalia, Chilmari, Daulatpur, Hogalbaria, Khalishakundi, Maricha, Mathurapur, Pearpur, Philipnagar, Pragpur, Ramkrishnapur, and Refaitpur. The union parishads are subdivided into 82 mauzas and 103 villages.

References

Upazilas of Kushtia District
Kushtia District
Khulna Division